Krishna Railway Station is located in  Narayanpet district of Telangana State belongs to South Central Railway zone, Guntakal railway division of Indian Railways. Neighbourhood stations are Chegunta, Saidapur, Yadlapur. Nearby major railway station is Secunderabad Junction another nearby major railway station is Raichur and airport is Rajiv Gandhi International Airport. A total of 16 express trains stop at this station. It is an important station for people in rural areas of neighbouring small villages such as Chegunta, Yadlapur. A lot of native Telugu people of this area are migrated to neighbouring  Maharashtra they visit their native villages occasionally.

Transportation facility
Here auto rickshaws and TSRTC buses are available.

See also
 Solapur–Guntakal section

References

Railway stations in Mahabubnagar district